is a special ward that forms part of the heart of Tokyo, Japan. The ward refers to itself in English as Chūō City. It was formed in 1947 as a merger of Kyobashi and Nihonbashi wards following Tokyo City's transformation into Tokyo Metropolis.

Chūō-ku, as a combination of Kyobashi and Nihonbashi, is the core of Shitamachi, the original downtown center of Edo-Tokyo. Literally meaning "Central Ward", it is historically the main commercial center of Tokyo, although Shinjuku has risen to challenge it since the end of World War II.

The most famous district in Chūō is Ginza, built on the site of a former silver mint from which it takes its name.

As of October 1, 2020, the ward has a resident population of 169,179, and a population density of 16,569 persons per km2. The total area is 10.21 km2. However, because of the concentration of businesses, offices and retail space, the daytime population swells to an estimated 650,000.

Geography
Chūō is in the central area of Tokyo, surrounded by the five special wards of Chiyoda, Minato, Taitō, Sumida, and Kōtō.

Administratively, Chūō is divided into the three zones of Nihonbashi, Kyobashi and Tsukishima. Nihonbashi and Kyobashi are predominantly commercial areas on the east side of Tokyo Station, and incorporate the famous districts of Ginza and Tsukiji. Tsukishima is a separate island in Tokyo Bay dominated by condominium towers.

Until World War II, the area was crisscrossed by small rivers and canals, used by small boats which were the primary vehicles of commerce at the time. After the war, many of these waterways were filled in to make way for new roads, buildings and expressways. However, the former waterways are the basis for many of the neighborhood divisions in the ward. The Sumida River forms the eastern boundary of the ward.

Chūō is physically the second-smallest ward in Tokyo, with a total area of just 10.15 km2; only Taitō is smaller.

History
 1612: Shōgun Tokugawa Ieyasu, planning to establish Edo as the de facto capital of Japan, begins work on a new commercial district surrounding the eastern end of the Tōkaidō, the main road connecting Tokyo and the Kansai region. During the Edo period this area is known as Edomachi—the town center of Edo. Much of the area (particularly Ginza and Tsukiji) was loose sand piled at the delta of the Sumida River before being filled in by the shogunate.
 1657: After a fire consumes much of the city, the area is re-planned with more canals to accommodate more maritime commerce.
 1869: A foreigners' settlement is established in Tsukiji. It continues until about 1899.
 1872: A fire consumes much of the Ginza area. In its aftermath, the governor of Tokyo re-plans Ginza to be a modern European-style commercial district between Shinbashi (the city's main railway terminal at the time) to the south and Nihonbashi (the main business and financial district) to the north.
 1878: Under a new local organization statute, the wards of Nihonbashi and Kyobashi are established under the government of Tokyo City, covering the area now occupied by Chūō.
 1945: Following Japan's defeat in World War II, several buildings are taken over by SCAP to serve as supply centers for the occupation forces. These include the Hattori Watch Company, the Matsuya department store and the Toshiba Building. The buildings are returned to Japanese civilian control by 1951.
 1947: Chūō Ward is founded on March 15 under the new Local Autonomy Law, merging the former Nihonbashi and Kyōbashi wards.

Districts and neighborhoods

Nihonbashi Area 
 Bakurochō (馬喰町)
 Hakozakicho: Location of Tokyo City Air Terminal (T-CAT)
 
 Arashio stable: Stable of professional sumo wrestlers
 
 
 
 Hongokucho: Location of Bank of Japan.
 
 Kabutocho: The securities district. Location of Tokyo Stock Exchange.
 
 Suitengu Shrine: A Shinto shrine at which women pray for conception and safe birth.
 
 Koamicho
 Kobunacho
 
 Muromachi: Location of Mitsukoshi department stores.
 Nakasu
 Nihonbashi: Traditional commercial center. Also home to the Takashimaya department stores, and the "zero milestone" from which highway distances to Tokyo are measured.
 
 
 
 

Kyōbashi Area 
 : Home to St. Luke's Hospital and Nursing School and the adjacent Garden Tower skyscraper.
 Ginza: Tokyo's most expensive shopping district, housing large stores such as Matsuya, Matsuzakaya, Mitsukoshi, Wako, and Printemps, as well as the famous Kabuki-za theater. At night, Ginza is ablaze with neon lights. Exclusive bars abound.
 Shinbashi Enbujō: A famous theater
 : Location of Hama-rikyū Gardens. A spacious public park, formerly the property of ''daimyō' of Kōshū, and later under the administration of the Imperial Household Agency
 : During the Edo period, the location of the police barracks
 Irifune
 Kyōbashi
 Minato (harbor)
 
 : A bridge across the Sumida River
 
 Tsukiji: Location of Chūō City Office. Widely viewed as one of the best sushi destinations in the world because of its huge wholesale fish market, which supplies restaurants and stores across eastern Japan. Also home to the Jōdo Shinshū temple of Tsukiji Hongan-ji.
 Yaesu: District on the east side of Tokyo Station(). The Yaesu side of Tokyo Station is the terminal for the Shinkansen "bullet train" lines.

Tsukishima Area 
 Harumi: the Harumi passenger terminal is here
 : The location of a bridge of the same name over the Sumida River
 
 Tsukishima;  Famous for many Monjayaki restaurants
 Tsukuda
 : A Shinto shrine with a history dating back to 1590

Economy
Ricoh is headquartered in the Ricoh Building in Chūō. The company moved its headquarters to the 25-story building in the Ginza area in Chūō from Minato, Tokyo in 2006. In the building the headquarters occupies the same space as its sales offices. Sumitomo Corporation is headquartered in the Harumi Island Triton Square Office Tower Y in Chūō. Daiichi Sankyo, a global pharmaceutical company is also headquartered in the ward, in the Daiichi Sankyo Building. Oji Paper Holdings and Hokuetsu Corporation, two pulp and paper manufacturing companies have their headquarters in Ginza and Nihonbashihongoku, respectively. J. Front Retailing has its headquarters in Yaesu. Asahi Shimbun, Mitsui E＆S, and Nihon Ad Systems have their headquarters in Tsukiji. Ajinomoto, Mitsui Fudosan, Shinsei Bank, Nomura Group and  Meidi-Ya are also headquartered in the ward. Shimizu Corporation and Sumitomo Mitsui Construction, two construction companies are headquartered in the ward, the former in Kyōbashi and the latter in Tsukuda district.
Orion Breweries and Takeda Pharmaceutical Company have their Tokyo-area offices in Chūō. Toray Industries, Denka and Kureha Corporation, three global chemical companies; Astellas Pharma, a global pharmaceutical company; KOSÉ, a personal care and cosmetics company; Nisshinbo Holdings, a diversified manufacturing company; and Akebono Brake Industry, an automobile component manufacturer have their headquarters in the Nihonbashi area of the ward. Sumitomo Chemical is also headquartered in the ward, in the Kyōbashi area. MODEC, a global supplier and operator of offshore floating platforms, T. Hasegawa, a flavors and fragrances company, and Nissan Chemical Corporation,  have their corporate headquarters in the Nihonbashi district.

Foreign operations
IBM has its Japan headquarters in Chūō.

Former economic operations
Dai-ichi Kikaku Senden Co., Ltd. opened in Chūō in Ginza, Chūō  in December 1951. In January 1958 the company relocated to a new headquarters in Ginza. The company moved to another headquarters in Ginza in September 1961 and its name changed to Dai-ichi Kikaku Co. Ltd. In November 1974, after growth, the company moved to another headquarters in Ginza. In November 1981 Dai-ichi Kikaku moved its head office to a facility in Ginza and a facility in Uchisaiwaichō, Chiyoda. The headquarters of Asatsu moved to Ginza in July 1995. Asatsu and Dai-ichi Kikaku merged into Asatsu-DK on January 1, 1999.

In the late 1990s GeoCities Japan was headquartered in the Nihonbashi Hakozaki Building in Nihonbashi.

Tokyopop maintained its Japanese headquarters in Mid-Tower of the Tokyo Towers.

Politics and government 
Chuo is run by a city assembly of 30 elected members. The current mayor is Yoshihide Yada, an independent backed Liberal Democratic Party and Komeito.

Elections 
2007 Chuo mayoral election

Transportation

Rail
At Tokyo Station, six Shinkansen, seven ordinary railway, and one subway line serve Chūō. In addition, three Toei subway lines stop at various stations throughout the ward.

Highway
Shuto Expressway
No. 1 Ueno Route (Edobashi JCT – Iriya)
No. 6 Mukojima Route (Edobashi JCT – Horikiri JCT)
No. 9 Fukagawa Route (Hakozaki JCT – Tatsumi JCT)
C1 Inner Loop (Edobashi–Takaracho–Kyōbashi–Ginza–Shiodome–Hamazakibashi–Shiba Park–Tanimachi–Kasumigaseki–Daikanmachi–Edobashi)

Education

Colleges and universities
 
 St. Luke's International University
 Waseda University Nihonbashi Campus

Primary and secondary education
Public elementary and junior high schools schools in Chūō are operated by the Chūō City Board of Education (中央区教育委員会). Public high schools are operated by the Tokyo Metropolitan Government Board of Education.

There is one prefectural high school in Chuo Ward, .

Public junior high schools include:
 Ginza Junior High School (銀座中学校)
 Harumi Junior High School (晴海中学校)
 Nihonbashi Junior High School (日本橋中学校)
 Tsukuda Junior High School (佃中学校)

Public elementary schools include:
 Akashi Elementary School (明石小学校) - 
 Its previous building opened in 1926. The Architectural Institute of Japan advocated for retaining the building, but the board of education chose to raze the building and build a new one.
 Arima Elementary School (有馬小学校) - 
 Chuo Elementary School - 
 Formed on April 1, 1993 (Heisei 5) by the merger of Kyoka Elementary School (京華小学校) and Teppozu Elementary School (鉄砲洲小学校).
 Hisamatsu Elementary School (久松小学校) - 
 Joto Elementary School (城東小学校) - Yaesu
 Kyobashi Tsukiji Elementary School (京橋築地小学校) - Tsukiji
 Meisho Elementary School (明正小学校) - 
 Nihonbashi Elementary School (日本橋小学校) - 
 Sakamoto Elementary School (阪本小学校) - 
 Taimei Elementary School - Ginza
 Tokiwa Elementary School (常盤小学校) - 
 Toyomi Elementary School (豊海小学校) - 
 Tsukishima Daiichi (No. 1) Elementary School (島第一小学校)
 Tsukishima Daini (No. 2) Elementary School (島第二小学校) - 
 Tsukishima Daisan (No. 3) Elementary School (島第三小学校) - Harumi
 Tsukudajima Elementary School (佃島小学校)

See also

Hakozakicho, Tokyo

References

External links

Chūō City Official Website 
Chūō City Tourism Association 

 
Wards of Tokyo